Northwind is a privately held company that develops property management systems, as well as GDS/web based booking solutions for the hospitality industry. Maestro Enterprise Suite, the company's flagship product, includes a variety of modules which can be co-ordinated to comply with a hotel or hotel chain's requirements. Maestro is a multi-platform system with over 10,000 users. It allows optimized adaptability to single or multi-property businesses. Northwind's headquarters are in Markham, Ontario, with sales and support offices located worldwide.

History 
 1978 - Company formed to respond to the need for custom software development
 1979 - Custom development of back office accounting, travel agency commission payables, and guest history management for a major Canadian hotel chain
 1980 - Ongoing development of various custom software modules in a mini computer environment
 1982 - Begin development of UNIX based hotel property management system (PMS)
 1983 - Development of Telephone Answering Services Management software
 1984 - Computerized Hospitality Solutions (CHS) Front Office successfully introduced to the market
 1986 - Decision to focus strictly on hospitality and retire non-hotel software
 1989 - U.S. sales office established in Florida.
 1992 - Begin development of UNIX and Windows version of new client/server PMS “CHS2000”
 1994 - CHS2000 Version 1 successfully introduced to the market
 1994 - First installation of CHS2000 Windows PMS
 1997 - Yield management functionality implemented as an integrated component of CHS2000
 1999 - CHS legacy software retired, existing clients offered free upgrade to Maestro
 1999 - CHS2000 redesigned and deployed as Maestro PMS
 2000 - Spa & Activities Management module developed for resort operations
 2001 - Shuttle Services Management module developed
 2002 - Extended Stay Management enhancements added to PMS
 2002 - Maestro Enterprise Multi-Property deployed
 2003 - Enhanced service initiative (Diamond Plus) deployed to all Maestro users
 2003 - Development of condominium owner accounting module
 2003 - ResEze real-time fully integrated Web Booking Engine introduced
 2004 - Added ASP Citrix & Terminal Services based support
 2005 - Enhanced security features including credit card masking and database encryption added for PCI compliance
 2006 - Enhanced Spa & Activities Management, Retail POS, and interfaces including 2-way GDS/OTA, 2-way Yield management
 2006 - Added Fine Dining POS, Club Membership and Golf Scheduling Modules
 2007 - Integrated Member Management system introduced
 2007 - Table Reservations with On-line functionality introduced
 2008 - ResWave Booking Engine extends functionality of online presence for clients
 2008 - Maestro Users Group is formed to promote client collaboration
 2008 - Diamond Plus Service expanded to include free On-Demand Live Training and Beginners Education program, Web Connection initiative of online features & functions deployed
 2010 - Launches Maestro Self-Service Touch Screen Kiosk, fully tokenized interface for payment card processing & Maestro PMS Certified for PCI Compliancy, PA-DSS Standards
 2011 - Integrated online property based member Loyalty Program, handheld checkin/checkout support
 2012 - Online loyalty program integration
 2013 - Introduction of self serve eLearning website for Maestro PMS users
 2014 - Introduction of Maestro Web, a browser based, feature equivalent version of Maestro PMS
 2014 - EMV credit card support added (Chip and Pin) for secure credit card payments
 2015 - Mobile tools added including housekeeping, online check in, and tablet based folio display
 2016 - Post Checkin Surveys, Mobile Checkout, Online Payment Portal
 2017 - Northwind acquires assets of Navicom Inc. to provide reputation management for its clients

Products & services

Maestro Enterprise Suite
The Maestro Enterprise Suite is a sophisticated property management system used by single and multi-property hotel groups to share information between all branches of an operation, allowing for total network control. The Maestro Enterprise Suite has the following modules:
 Maestro Property Management Suite
 Maestro Sales & Catering Suite
 Maestro Multi-Property Suite
 Maestro Corporate Enterprise Suite

ResWave
ResWave is Northwind's real-time, on-line web booking suite, allowing package customization of guest services such as room, spa, dining & event reservations, and group management.

Diamond Plus
Diamond Plus is a support service initiative provided by Northwind to its clients. The service includes access to a 24/7 support center, remote training facilities for clients, software customization, and access to self-serve web training and documentation.

Executives 
 Warren Dehan - President
 Audrey MacRae - Vice President

References 

Companies based in Markham, Ontario
Software companies of Canada
Privately held companies of Canada